Binyamin Appelbaum is the lead writer on business and economics for the Editorial Board of The New York Times. He joined the board in March 2019. He was previously a Washington correspondent for the Times, covering the Federal Reserve and other aspects of economic policy. Appelbaum has previously worked for The Florida Times-Union, The Charlotte Observer, The Boston Globe and The Washington Post. He graduated in 2001 from the University of Pennsylvania with a B.A. in history. He was executive editor of the student newspaper, The Daily Pennsylvanian.

The Economists' Hour
His first book, The Economists' Hour, was published in September 2019. The book "traces the rise of the economists, first in the United States and then around the globe, as their ideas reshaped the modern world, curbing government, unleashing corporations and hastening globalization."

Career
In 2007 Appelbaum was part of a team of reporters at The Charlotte Observer that helped shed light on the area's high rate of housing foreclosures and questionable sales practices by Beazer Homes USA, one of the United States' largest homebuilders. A profile of his reporting on the subprime mortgage crisis described how, well before the nation knew about the coming crisis in mortgage lending, Appelbaum "noticed a strange pattern while compiling a list of foreclosed homes in North Carolina’s Mecklenburg County—clusters were concentrated in new developments. Appelbaum wondered if faulty loans were behind the trend".  series led to FBI, IRS, SEC, and HUD investigations of Beazer Homes, which has since stopped making mortgage loans nationwide and stopped building homes in Charlotte, North Carolina.

"Beazer's crime wave might have gone on longer than it did, but for a North Carolina newspaper, The Charlotte Observer," wrote Floyd Norris of The New York Times. The series won a Gerald Loeb Award for Medium Newspapers, a George Polk Award and was a finalist for the 2008 Pulitzer Prize in public service.

Appelbaum's November 8, 2018 tweet claiming the term 'gaslighting' was not an "actual English word" sent lookups for the word up 14,000% on Merriam-Webster.com, putting it on their list of trending terms.

He has two siblings: Yoni Appelbaum and Avigail Appelbaum.

References

External links
 

The Daily Pennsylvanian people
Living people
Year of birth missing (living people)
Gerald Loeb Award winners for Small and Medium Newspapers
American male journalists
21st-century American journalists
21st-century American male writers
The New York Times columnists
The New York Times editorial board